Francisco Bangoy International Airport, also commonly known as Davao International Airport, is the main airport serving Davao City and Davao Region in the Philippines. It is the busiest airport on the island of Mindanao and the third busiest in the Philippines in 2022.

History

Early history 
The site of the airport began operations in the 1940s as Sasa Landing Field with a donation of land in barangay Sasa, located in Buhangin district of Davao City, by Don Francisco Bangoy, the then-current patriarch of an influential family that founded and settled in Davao alongside Don Jose Uyanguren. At the time it began operation, the airport merely consisted of a  unpaved grass runway and quonset huts serving as terminal buildings. At the time, and throughout much of the 1940s and the early 1950s, both Philippine Air Lines and the Philippine Air Force provided air service to the city.

As a civil aviation airport 

The Davao (Sasa) Airport was opened for civil aviation on August 25, 1958. The grass airstrip was later converted as a taxiway for general aviation.

By 1959, the complex consisted of a small control tower and several low-rise buildings. Right of way and access to the terminal buildings and the airport were improved through further donation of land by Paciano Bangoy, Francisco's son, during the latter stages of Paciano's gubernatorial term. On June 19, 1960, Republic Act No. 2762 was enacted which renamed the airport to Francisco Bangoy Airport in honor of the late Don Francisco Bangoy.

A new terminal designed by Filipino architect Leandro Locsin, with a capacity of one million passengers, started construction in 1976 and was completed in 1980. The project, in addition to runway expansions, was funded during the term of then-Congressman Manuel Garcia, whose congressional district covers the airport perimeter. Airbus A300 operations by Philippine Airlines started on September 1, 1989, marking the first widebody service to the city. The first scheduled international passenger service started on April 29, 1992, with the inauguration of Bouraq Airlines flights to Manado, Indonesia. After the launch of scheduled international flights to Davao, regular flights to Malaysia and Singapore were also commenced by Malaysia Airlines in 1996 and SilkAir in 1997, respectively.

Expansion 
Rapid growth at the airport precipitated the construction of a  million interim international terminal beside the airport's then-existing terminal, and then eventually a new, larger terminal building that would consolidate the two existing terminals. In planning since 1992, construction began in 2000 and was subsequently inaugurated on December 2, 2003, with a capacity double that of the old airport terminal. The construction of the new ₱2.7 billion building was funded by both the Asian Development Bank (ADB) and the European Investment Bank (EIB). The modernization and upgrading of the airport facilities aim to make Davao as a hub for tourism and foreign investment in the region. Development was funded by a  million loan from the ADB, co-financed by the EIB for twenty-five million ECUs, and through budgetary allocations from the government. The total cost of the project amounted to US$128 million.

As part of the modernization of the airport, the runway was once again extended to the current  in 2001 to accommodate future international flights.

Contemporary history 
On November 12, 2007, Cebu Pacific announced the airport as its third hub. Likewise, Philippine Airlines announced the airport as its third hub on March 26, 2018.

In June 2015, the Mindanao Development Authority plans to turn the 1980–2003 airport terminal into a trade and cultural museum.

Republic Act No. 11457, also known as the Charter of the Davao International Airport Authority, was approved on August 30, 2019, creating and establishing the Davao International Airport Authority, which will manage all airports in the Davao Region, including the Francisco Bangoy International Airport.

Future development 
The airport was slated for upgrading in 2016, but the project was shelved. In 2017, an expansion project of the airport was announced. Udenna Corporation submitted an unsolicited proposal in 2018 and received the original proponent status by the Department of Transportation in that year.

The expansion and upgrading project would involve the expansion of the existing passenger terminal building, landside and airside developments, construction of a parallel taxiway, and the introduction of new technologies.

Structure

Terminal 
The current passenger terminal is a Malay architecture-inspired building which is four times larger than the old terminal. It has four (4) jetbridges for passenger boarding. It has a Flight Information Display System and closed-circuit television system complementing the terminal's security system. It is designed to handle approximately 4 million passengers annually. The added capacity is complemented by the latest navigational, security, and baggage handling equipment.

The terminal has 14 domestic and 14 international check-in counters that can handle a steady flow of passenger traffic. The check-in counters are equipped with electronic weighing scales and conveyors and its baggage handling system is also computerized. It has two arrival areas, for domestic and international flights, with two baggage conveyors each.

Runway 

Complementing the runway are two (2) turning pads at each end of it, which help aircraft make a backtrack. The installation of a new instrument landing system (ILS) for both Runways 05 and 23 upgraded its compliance to International Civil Aviation Organization (ICAO) operating category-Precision Approach Category 1. It can accommodate 8 to 10 aircraft landings per hour, depending on size and has the equivalent 9 gate holding areas for those aircraft. The airport has two dual access taxiways. Taxiways A3 and A4 are used to access the new ramp and terminal; taxiways B and C are used for access to the old airport ramp.

The Antonov An-124 is, by far, the largest aircraft to land at the airport. It is the fourth largest aircraft in the world, next to the Boeing 747-8.

Other structures 
Besides the main terminal building, there are also new support facilities like the administration building, airfield maintenance building, central plant building, hangar for military and training aircraft, and an ARFF building. It has an 800-slot car parking area and four slots for shuttle buses. It has a  standby power generator.

Airlines and destinations 

Notes

Statistics 
Data from the Civil Aviation Authority of the Philippines (CAAP).

An em dash (—) is used when data from CAAP is not available.

Access and transportation 

The airport is connected to the city via the Carlos P. Garcia National Highway. The 4-laned La Verna-Mamay Bypass Road was constructed and finished in 2017 near the airport to decongest traffic going from Mamay road to the airport and beyond and vice versa, by avoiding the usually busy intersection of Mamay Road and the Carlos P. Garcia National Highway. To avoid widening a road, which would displace houses and creep onto the airport's site, the road splits into two for 600 meters then merges back. It has a length of 1.7 kilometers, and is able to accommodate 1,000 vehicles per day.

The planned Davao City Expressway will further connect the airport to the city via a diamond interchange. If it goes according to plan, the entire project will be completed in 2026.

Accidents and incidents 

On April 19, 2000, Air Philippines Flight 541, a Boeing 737-200 en route from Manila to Davao crashed near the airport, killing 131 people.
On March 4, 2003, a bomb exploded in the waiting shed outside the old terminal building, killing 21 people. At least 145 others were injured.
On the night of August 25, 2008, a Philippine Air Force Lockheed L-100 Hercules bound for Iloilo City crashed into Davao Gulf shortly after takeoff. The aircraft sank 800 feet into the gulf. The incident killed nine crew members plus two Philippine Army soldiers. After several days of a search-and-retrieval operation, the wreckage was found with the help of a US Navy ship, the USNS John McDonnell.
On June 2, 2013, Cebu Pacific Flight 971, an Airbus A320 carrying 165 passengers inbound from Manila, overshot the runway during a heavy rain. There were no fatalities, but the plane was heavily damaged. The damaged aircraft was moved to the old airport terminal for investigation and parting.
On January 16, 2018, Cebu Pacific Flight 970, an Airbus A330-300 bound for Manila, was delayed by almost three hours over a bomb joke by one of the passengers on board.
On January 29, 2023, another bomb joke occurred at the airport, causing Cebu Pacific Flight 978, an Airbus A321neo bound for Manila, to be delayed by three hours. The alleged passenger who made the joke was arrested, and the plane was moved to an isolation area where all baggage of the 221 passengers on board were rescanned. The plane was scheduled to depart for Manila at six in the evening, but was only allowed to take off at past nine in the evening later that day.

See also 
List of airports in the Philippines
Tallest buildings in Davao City

References

External links 
– AECOM
What's On & Expat Magazine, June 18, 2006 – Upgraded Davao City International Airport Is Ready for More Passengers and Bigger Aircraft
 
 
 

Airports in the Philippines
Buildings and structures in Davao City
Transportation in Mindanao